The western snowy plover (Charadrius nivosus nivosus) is a small wader in the plover bird family. It breeds in the southern and western United States and the Caribbean. 

On March 5, 1993, the western snowy plover was listed as a threatened species under the Endangered Species Act of 1973. As of June 19, 2012, the habitat along the California, Oregon, and Washington Coasts have been listed as critical.

See also
Guadalupe-Nipomo Dunes

References

External links 
 Western Snowy Plover - Tools and Resources for Recovery

western snowy plover
western snowy plover
Birds of the United States
Fauna of the San Francisco Bay Area
Subspecies